Warwick Senior High School is a public co-educational high day school, located in Warwick, a northern suburb of Perth, Western Australia. Founded in 1981, the school provides education to approximately 900 students from Year 7 to Year 12.

Specialist programs offered include netball, football, and academic excellence.

Notable alumni

 Melissa George, actress
 Shane Lowe, from the Lewis and Lowe breakfast show on Nova 919
 Michu Meszaros, actor 
 Tracey Pemberton, former Perth Orioles netballer
 Natalie Saleeba, actor, who has starred in All Saints and Neighbours
 Aaron Summers (cricketer), first Australian cricketer to play domestic cricket in Pakistan.
 Mark Hutchings, West Coast Eagles footballer

See also

 List of schools in the Perth metropolitan area

References

External links 
 Warwick Senior High School website

Public high schools in Perth, Western Australia
Educational institutions established in 1981
1981 establishments in Australia